Morris Yel Akol is a South Sudanese politician. He has served as Minister of Finance of Western Bahr el Ghazal since 18 May 2010.

References

21st-century South Sudanese politicians
Living people
People from Western Bahr el Ghazal
Year of birth missing (living people)